Imanol Uribe (born 28 February 1950) is a Spanish screenwriter and film director. He won the Goya Award for Best Director and Best Screenplay for the 1994 thriller Running Out of Time.

Biography 
Born in San Salvador on 28 February 1950 to parents from Biscay, Uribe was raised since age 7 in Biscay. From 1982 to 2004, he was married to María Barranco, whom with he has had one child in common. He has won the Goya Award for Best Director for Días contados as well as the San Sebastian Film Festival's Golden Shell for Bwana.

Filmography

References

External links

1950 births
Living people
People from San Salvador
Salvadoran people of Basque descent
Salvadoran emigrants to Spain
Spanish film directors
Spanish screenwriters
Spanish male writers
Male screenwriters
Spanish film producers
Best Director Goya Award winners